Leonardo Rafael dos Santos (born 25 April 2001), known as Léo Rafael, is a Brazilian footballer who plays as a midfielder for Ceará.

Club career
Born in Campinas, São Paulo, Léo Rafael played youth football for Barretos, Rio Claro, Juventude and Bragantino, leaving the latter in 2019 when the club merged with Red Bull Brasil. He subsequently joined Grêmio Osasco, and made his senior debut during the 2019 Copa Paulista.

On 12 September 2020, Léo Rafael signed for Caldense. The following 17 March, he moved to Ceará, being initially assigned to the under-20 squad.

On 6 September 2021, Léo Rafael renewed his contract with Ceará for a further year. He was promoted to the first team on 27 December, and made his first team debut for the club the following 22 February, starting in a 2–1 Campeonato Cearense home win over Iguatu.

Léo Rafael made his Série A debut on 17 April 2022, coming on as a late substitute for Richard in a 1–3 home loss against Botafogo.

Career statistics

References

External links
Ceará profile 

2001 births
Living people
Sportspeople from Campinas
Brazilian footballers
Association football midfielders
Campeonato Brasileiro Série A players
Campeonato Brasileiro Série D players
Grêmio Esportivo Osasco players
Associação Atlética Caldense players
Ceará Sporting Club players